Australothis is a genus of moths of the family Noctuidae.

Species
 Australothis exopisso Matthews, 1999
 Australothis hackeri Kobes, 1995
 Australothis rubrescens - Indian Weed Caterpillar (Walker, 1858)
 Australothis tertia (Roepke, 1941)
 Australothis volatilis Matthews & Patrick, 1998

References
 Matthews, M. & Patrick, B. (1998). "A new diurnal species of Heliothinae (Lepidoptera: Noctuidae) endemic to New Zealand." Journal of Natural History 32: 263-271.
 Natural History Museum Lepidoptera genus database

Heliothinae